Ruth Goetz was a German screenwriter active during the silent era. She was credited on more than 60 films over the course of her career.

Selected filmography 
 The Beggar Countess (dir. Joe May and Bruno Ziener, 1918)
 The Platonic Marriage (dir. Paul Leni, 1919)
 Veritas Vincit (dir. Joe May, 1919)
 The Bodega of Los Cuerros (dir. Erik Lund, 1919)
 The Foolish Heart (dir. Erik Lund, 1919)
 The Mistress of the World (dir. Joe May, 1919–1920)
 The Enchanted Princess (dir. Erik Lund, 1919)
 The Fairy of Saint Ménard (dir. Erik Lund, 1919) 
 The World Champion (dir. Erik Lund, 1919)
 The Last Sun Son (dir. Erik Lund, 1919)
 The Commandment of Love (dir. Erik Lund, 1919)
 The Eyes of the World (dir. Carl Wilhelm, 1920)
 The Clan (dir. Carl Wilhelm, 1920)
 The Three Aunts (dir. Rudolf Biebrach, 1921)
 The Circle of Death (dir. , 1922)
 The Second Shot (dir. Maurice Krol, 1923)
 The Island of Tears (dir. Lothar Mendes, 1923)
 The Great Industrialist (dir. , 1923)
 The Four Marriages of Matthias Merenus (dir. Werner Funck, 1924)
 The Monk from Santarem (dir. Lothar Mendes, 1924)
 Reveille: The Great Awakening (dir. , 1925)
 The Salesgirl from the Fashion Store (dir. Wolfgang Neff, 1925)
 In the Valleys of the Southern Rhine (dir. Rudolf Walther-Fein and Rudolf Dworsky, 1925)
 The Fallen (dir. Rudolf Walther-Fein and Rudolf Dworsky, 1926)
 Women and Banknotes (dir. , 1926)
 The Adventurers (dir. Rudolf Walther-Fein, 1926)
 Marriage Announcement (dir. , 1926)
 Accommodations for Marriage (dir. Georg Jacoby, 1926)
 Tragedy of a Marriage (dir. Maurice Elvey, 1927)
 Tragedy of the Street (dir. , 1927)
 A Murderous Girl (dir. Sidney Morgan, 1927)
 The Glass Boat (dir. Constantin J. David and Jacqueline Milliet, 1927)
 Give Me Life (dir. Klaus Fery, 1928)

References

External links

German women screenwriters
Women film pioneers
Silent film screenwriters
1965 deaths
1886 births
People from Prudnik County
20th-century German screenwriters
German emigrants to the United Kingdom